Sudoměřice is a municipality and village in Hodonín District in the South Moravian Region of the Czech Republic. It has about 1,300 inhabitants.

Geography
It lies in a flat landscape of the Lower Morava Valley. The Baťa Canal flows through the municipality.

Sights

A technical monument is the Sudoměřice coal tipper. The tipper was used to transfer lignite to ships on the Baťa Canal, which was brought by rail from a nearby mine. It dates from 1939. Today it serves as a lookout tower, and in its interior there is an exhibition about its function.

References

Villages in Hodonín District
Moravian Slovakia